Saint Francis of Assisi is a Roman Catholic church founded 1902 in Toronto, Ontario, Canada. It is located in the west end neighbourhood of Little Italy and Trinity-Bellwoods, and within the Roman Catholic Archdiocese of Toronto.

History 
The original Church and Parish Community of St. Francis of Assisi were established in 1902 on the corner of Dundas (then known as Arthur Street) and Grace Street.  The church was designed by architect Charles J. Read.  The original church cost $20,000 to build and was a simple red brick church in the gothic revival style.

During the erection of the church, Services and Holy Mass was celebrated in 1902 and the first part of 1903 at St. Francis School on Manning Avenue.
The Church was opened and blessed by Archbishop O'Connor on June 7, 1903. The first Pastor appointed to Saint Francis of Assisi was Msgr. William A. McCann.

The parish continued to grow over the years, a result of the migration of predominately Irish Catholics to the area attracted by the increasing development of the area and new homes being sold or built in the area.  By 1914 the congregation had outgrown its church's capacity.  It was decided a new church and rectory was to be built on the corner of Grace Street and Mansfield Avenue.  The architect appointed to design the new church was Arthur William Holmes, who also designed many noteworthy churches in the Archdiocese such as Holy Rosary, St. Helen's, and St. Michael's College.

The new parish church was to be an imposing roman gothic stone structure of 158 x 57 feet, with transepts. The cornerstone of the new Saint Francis Church was laid on September 27, 1914, by Archbishop McNeil. In a copper chest inserted into the cornerstone were coins of the realm, newspapers, and a scroll bearing the names of the King and Governors of the country, the Pontiff, the Archbishop, Pastor, and Architect. The exterior stone of the church was quarried and cut in Port Arthur, now known as Thunder Bay. The Church itself was completed at a cost of $115,000 and was blessed by Archbishop McNeil on October 31, 1915. The parish hall was opened on November 3, with a concert put on by St. Francis' Glee Club.

When the new Church of St. Francis of Assisi was completed on the corner of Grace Street and Mansfield Avenue, in October 1915, all the legal documents and church documents were moved to the new location and the old church on Dundas and Grace was then called St. Agnes.

A point of distinction from other churches is its large stained glass clerestory windows. There are a total of twenty-one stained glass windows made by N.T. Lyon Glass Co. Limited of Toronto and four of those windows depicting scenes from the life of St. Francis of Assisi were made by the studios of George Boos of Munich, Germany before First World War broke out.

The parish also boasts a fine Pipe Organ made in 1914 by the Canadian Pipe Organ Company Ltd. of St. Hyacinthe, Quebec, and very much in the style of Casavant organs of that time. However, this organ included some very interesting innovations such as brass pipe lips and thin-walled lead principals which enhance the beauty and majesty of its sound.

In 1950, Msgr. William Alfred McCann died having been pastor of Saint Francis of Assisi for 48 years. During the time of Msgr. McCann's leadership he was the source of many vocations to the priesthood and religious life of Nuns and Brothers.  Future Bishops of Canada were also raised in our Parish. There has been a long and strong relationship for the past 98 years with the Carmelite Sisters on Harrison Street who at that time (1914) ran an orphanage for young ladies that later was transformed into a Carmelite Day Nursery. The Third Order of St. Francis was established in the parish in 1921. In the presence of Archbishop Neil McNeil over 500 were received into the order.

The parish remained under the pastoral care of the diocesan clergy of the Archdiocese of Toronto until 1957 when the Servite Order was asked to assume the administration of St. Francis of Assisi.  Fr. George Nincheri, O.S.M., was appointed as Pastor in part to care for some of the needs of the ever-growing Italian Immigrant Community settling in the area.

In 1968 the pastoral care of the parish was given to the Franciscan Province of the Immaculate Conception (New York). The Franciscans had been working and ministering at St. Agnes since 1936 but were given the care of St. Francis Parish as a result of the diminishing English congregation and the ever-increasing Italian Community.

In 1968, Fr. Ambrose De Luca, O.F.M., together with the other Friars took over the dual administration of St. Francis/St. Agnes. In 1970 the Friars and the Italian Community left St. Agnes giving the church over to the Portuguese Community and moving the Italian-speaking community to St. Francis of Assisi.

In September of 2022, the pastoral care of the parish reverted back to the diocesan clergy.

Pastors 
 Rev. Msgr. William A. McCann (1902–1950)
 Rev. Daniel J. O' Neil (1950–1957)
 Rev. George Nincheri, O.S.M. (1957–1959)
 Rev. Carini Graziani, O.S.M (1959–1968)
 Rev. Ambrose De Luca, O.F.M. (1968–1970)
 Rev. Arthur Lattanzi, O.F.M. (1970–1976)
 Rev Januarius M. Izzo, O.F.M (1976–1979)
 Rev. Primo Piscitello, O.F.M. (1979–1982)
 Rev. Angelo Bucciero, O.F.M. (1982–1990)
 Rev. Frederick Mazzarella, O.F.M. (1990–1992)
 Rev. Gregory Botte, O.F.M. (1992–2012)
 Rev. Jimmy Zammit, O.F.M. (2012–2019)
 Rev. Francis Walter, O.F.M. (2019-2022)
 Rev. Massimo Buttigieg (2022-Present)

Parish Schools 
 Saint Francis of Assisi Catholic Elementary School, 80 Clinton Street
 Pope Francis Catholic Elementary School, 319 Ossington Avenue

Mass Times 
The current Mass times are:

Sundays and Holy Days of Obligation

5:00 p.m. Saturday (English)

9:00 a.m. (Italian)

11:30 a.m. (English)

Weekdays

8:00 a.m. (Italian Mondays, Tuesdays, Thursdays and Fridays & English every Wednesday)

References 

Roman Catholic churches in Ontario
Roman Catholic churches in Toronto
1902 establishments in Ontario